Charlotte Ann "Chickie" Mason coached both women's basketball at the college level and softball at the high school and college level.  Her coaching experience ranged from the high school level finishing her career at Medina Valley High School (Texas) in [Castroville], Texas to two year collegiate programs at McClennan Community College and Temple Junior College to NCAA Division III level at Mary Hardin–Baylor to NCAA Division II level at North Dakota to the NCAA Division I level at Lamar, Nevada, and UTSA.

She helped begin women's programs at two universities, UTSA Roadrunners and University of Mary Hardin–Baylor.  She was the first head coach for the UTSA Roadrunners softball program.  After leaving UTSA, she became part of the Mary Hardin–Baylor staff in 1998.  There, Coach Mason again was instrumental in starting programs in both women's basketball and softball at the university.  She is listed as the first head coach for both women's basketball and softball for the Mary Hardin-Baylor Crusaders.

Early life and education
Charlotte Ann Mason was born in East St. Louis, Illinois and moved to San Antonio, Texas at age eight. She also lived in Colorado as a child. Mason graduated from Wayland Baptist University in 1968 and did graduate-level work at Texas A&M University and Baylor University.

Coaching career
Mason began her coaching career in 1968 as girls' basketball coach at Eastland High School in Eastland, Texas. In 1976, she moved to Kerrville, Texas to coach at Tivy High School.

From 1979 to 1984, Mason coached at McLennan Community College in Waco, Texas. She then coached women's basketball at Lamar University from 1984 to 1986, Temple Junior College from 1986 to 1988, and the University of Nevada, Reno from 1988 to 1990.

After nearly two decades as a basketball coach, Mason moved to coaching softball, starting at the University of North Dakota in 1991. Mason returned to Texas after one season to become the first softball head coach at UTSA. In seven seasons (1992 to 1998), Mason posted a 179–166–1 record at UTSA. Mason then coached both women's basketball and softball at the University of Mary Hardin-Baylor from 1998 to 2000, being promoted to head softball coach in 2000 after being a pitching coach in 1999. From 2001 to 2008, she coached softball at Medina High School in Medina, Texas.

Head coaching record

Women's basketball

Softball

References 

1945 births
2011 deaths
High school basketball coaches in the United States
McLennan Highlanders women's basketball coaches
Lamar Lady Cardinals basketball coaches
Temple Leopards women's basketball coaches
Nevada Wolf Pack women's basketball coaches
Mary Hardin–Baylor Crusaders women's basketball coaches
Wayland Baptist University alumni
Texas A&M University alumni
Baylor University alumni
American women's basketball coaches
Basketball coaches from Illinois
Basketball coaches from Texas
Sportspeople from East St. Louis, Illinois
People from Eastland, Texas
North Dakota Fighting Hawks softball coaches
UTSA Roadrunners softball coaches
Mary Hardin–Baylor Crusaders softball coaches